Oliver Maron (born September 30, 1983) is a Slovak professional ice hockey defenceman who played with HC Slovan Bratislava in the Slovak Extraliga. Maron played junior hockey with the Belleville Bulls.

References

External links
 

Living people
HC Slovan Bratislava players
Belleville Bulls players
1983 births
Slovak ice hockey defencemen